The Global Leadership Foundation (GLF) is a non-profit, non-governmental organization consisting of a network of former heads of state/government and other distinguished leaders (GLF Members), who seek to assist developing countries in improving governance, bolstering democratic institutions, and resolving conflicts. The organization does so by arranging for GLF Members to provide confidential peer-to-peer advice to current heads of governments, who are committed to peace, democracy, and development. The Global Leadership Foundation is active across the world, works via invitation from a head of government, and its work is confidential.

Organization

The Global Leadership Foundation (GLF) was set up in 2004 by F. W. de Klerk as a network of former national leaders to advise newly-democratic countries on issues of governance and stability.  GLF works discreetly on policy issues with these leaders.   The initial members were Václav Havel, Quett Masire, and Aníbal Cavaco Silva.    

Since its establishment in 2004, GLF's engagements have included advice on the following:

 Democratic institutions, effective governance, and transition from authoritarian rule
 Effective election management
 Regional and national security
 Political reconciliation and implementation of international agreements
 Tackling armed resistance movements and terrorist organizations
 Economic reform, resource management, and trade
 Access to humanitarian aid

In addition to the provision of direct but discreet advice on an ever-increasing range of topics to serving national leaders, GLF engages in the following:

 Active discussion of important global issues
 Proactive consideration of national crisis situations with international implications
 Dialogues with the heads of key multilateral institutions
 International conferences on topical issues
 Consultation and working with like-minded organizations

While GLF does not seek to publicize its work with world leaders, some visits are in the public domain, such as the 2011 visit to the Maldives by Cassam Uteem, the 2013 visit to Kenya by Joe Clark and Quett Masire, the 2014 and 2015 visits to Ghana by FW de Klerk, Quett Masire and Kaspar Villiger, and the mediation role Quett Masire played in negotiating a ceasefire agreement in Mozambique in 2016. .

Upon de Klerk's death in late 2021, Helen Clark became the new GLF chair.

There are currently 45 GLF Members. New members are selected by existing members.

The Foundation is supported by the GLF International Council, which consists of organizations and individuals who recognize the importance of GLF's work and support the foundation financially.  A limit is placed on the size of each donation to preserve the foundation's independence.

GLF is registered in the Canton of Bern, Switzerland. It has two associate foundations: GLF (USA), a 501(c)(3) foundation registered in Delaware, US; and GLF (UK), a charity registered in England and Wales.

List of GLF members:

M. Hamid Ansari India, Vice President 2007-17, Ambassador to the UN 1993-95, Carl Bildt Sweden, Prime Minister 1991-94, Foreign Minister 2006-14, UN Special Envoy to the Balkans 1999-01, Lakhdar Brahimi Algeria, Foreign Minister 1991-93, Special Adviser to the UN Secretary General 2004-05, UN and Arab League Special Envoy to Syria 2012-14, John Bruton Ireland, Prime Minister 1994-97, EU Ambassador to the United States 2004-09, Micheline Calmy-Rey Switzerland, President of the Swiss Confederation 2007 and 2011,   Head of the Department of Foreign Affairs 2003-11, Hikmet Çetin Turkey, Deputy Prime Minister 1978-79 & 1995, Foreign Minister, 1991-94, Lynda Chalker UK, Minister of Overseas Development 1989-97, Helen Clark (Vice Chairman) New Zealand, Prime Minister, 1999-08, Administrator of the UNDP 2009-17, Joe Clark Canada, Prime Minister 1979-80, Secretary of State for External, Affairs 1984-1991, Chester Crocker USA, Assistant Secretary of State for African Affairs 1981-89, Marzuki Darusman Indonesia, Attorney General 1999-01, UN Special Rapporteur Democratic People's Republic of Korea (DPRK) 2010-16, FW de Klerk South Africa, President 1989-94, Alvaro de Soto Peru, UN Under-Secretary-General 1999-07, Mohamed ElBaradei Egypt, Director General, International Atomic Energy Agency 1997-09, Interim Vice President 2013, Amara Essy Côte d’Ivoire, Foreign Minister, 1990-00, Secretary General OAU, 2001-02, Chairman AU Commission 2002-03, Gareth Evans Australia, Foreign Minister 1988-96,  President and CEO of the International Crisis Group 2000-09 
Vicente Fox Mexico, President 2000-06, Louise Fréchette Canada, UN Deputy Secretary-General 1998-06, Lawrence Gonzi Malta, Prime Minister 2004-13, Minister of Finance 2004-08 and Minister of Social Policy 1998-04, Enrique Iglesias Uruguay, Foreign Minister 1985-88, President of Inter-American Development Bank 1988-05, Donald Kaberuka Rwanda, Finance Minister 1997-05, President of the African Development Bank 2005-15, John Kufuor Ghana, President 2001-09, Hervé Ladsous France, United Nations Under-Secretary-General for Peacekeeping Operations 2011-17, Ricardo Luna Peru, Minister of Foreign Affairs 2016-18, Donald McHenry USA, Ambassador to the UN 1979-81, Festus Mogae Botswana, President 1998-08
Ana Palacio Spain, Foreign Minister 2002-04, Supachai Panitchpakdi Thailand, Secretary General UNCTAD 2005-13, Director General WTO 2002-05, Deputy Prime Minister 1997-03, P.J. Patterson Jamaica, Prime Minister 1992-06, Thomas Pickering USA, Under-Secretary of State for Political Affairs 1997-00, Ambassador to the UN 1989-92, Jean-Pierre Raffarin France, Prime Minister 2002-05, Fidel Valdez Ramos The Philippines, President 1992-98, José Ramos-Horta Timor-Leste, President 2007-12, Prime Minister 2006-07, George Robertson UK, Secretary General NATO 1999-04, Secretary of State for Defence 1997-99, Kevin Rudd Australia, Prime Minister 2007-10, 2013, Foreign Minister 2010-12, Ghassan Salamé Lebanon, Lebanon, Minister of Culture, 2000-03, Senior Advisor to the UN Secretary-General 2003-06, Salim Ahmed Salim Tanzania, Prime Minister 1984-85, Secretary General OAU 1989-01, Wolfgang Schüssel Austria, Federal Chancellor 2000-07, Foreign Minister 1995-00, Ellen Johnson Sirleaf Liberia, President 2006-18, Javier Solana Spain, Secretary General Council of European Union 1999-09, Secretary General NATO 1995-99, Foreign Minister 1992-95, Eduardo Stein Guatemala, Vice President 2004-08, Foreign Minister 1996-00, Cassam Uteem Mauritius, President 1992-02, Juan Gabriel Valdés Chile, Foreign Minister 1999, Ambassador to the UN 2000-03, Vaira Vīķe-Freiberga Latvia, President 1999-07, Kaspar Villiger Switzerland, President of the Swiss Confederation 1995 & 2002, Minister of Defence 1989-95, Minister of Finance 1996-03

The story of GLF is featured in a book by the Owls Cooperative entitled "Impact Breakthrough: From Innovation to Impact". The work illustrates, through a wide range of specific examples, how good ideas can be made real and deliver effect. 

A recent publication by BBC documentary producer Giles Edwards titled "The Ex Men - How Our Former Presidents and Prime Ministers Are Still Changing the World" examines the many ways that GLF Members, amongst other former presidents and prime ministers, have played an important role in public life after leaving elected political office.

References

External links
 Official website
FW de Klerk interview April 2017 (Transcript on Medium.com)
 The Ex Men: How Our Former Presidents and Prime Ministers Are Still Changing the World  
International nongovernmental organizations